Crispen Mutakanyi (born 15 March 1970) is a retired male middle distance runner from Zimbabwe. He represented his native African country at the 2000 Summer Olympics in Sydney, Australia and the 1999 World Championships in Seville, Spain.

He has personal bests in the 800 metres of 1:45.1 minutes outdoors (Harare 1998) and 1:52.94 minutes indoors (Lisbon 2001).

Competition record

References

External links
sports-reference

1970 births
Living people
Zimbabwean male middle-distance runners
Athletes (track and field) at the 2000 Summer Olympics
Olympic athletes of Zimbabwe
Athletes (track and field) at the 1998 Commonwealth Games
Commonwealth Games competitors for Zimbabwe
World Athletics Championships athletes for Zimbabwe
African Games bronze medalists for Zimbabwe
African Games medalists in athletics (track and field)
Athletes (track and field) at the 1999 All-Africa Games
Athletes (track and field) at the 2003 All-Africa Games